The 2020–21 Kosovar Cup is the football knockout competition of Kosovo in the 2020–21 season.

First round 
The draw for the first round was held on 26 October 2020. In this round 10 teams from Second League and Third League of Kosovo are involved.

Second round 
Five teams previously qualified from First round took part in Second round. Two winners of both paths advanced into Round of 16, all matches were played in November.

Round of 32 
The draw for the Round of 32 was firstly scheduled on 27 November 2020 but later was canceled and postponed until 8 December, so the autumn season will finished and the teams could be seeded into pots using their actual positions. According to the new rules of the competition, from this round the team must be separated into pots.

Seeding 
In this round 32 teams are involved. Two winners from the last round, 10 teams from Superleague and 20 teams from First League of Kosovo are involved.

Summary 
The draw for the Round of 32 was held on 8 December 2020, 13:00 CET. The matches were played from 12 December to 17 December 2020. All matches started at 12:30 CET.

Round of 16 
The draw for the Round of 16 was held on 11 January 2021, 13:00 CET. The matches were played from 9 to 11 February 2021. All matches started at 13:00 CET.

Summary

Quarter-finals 
The draw for Quarter-finals was held on 18 February 2021. The matches were played on 17 and 18 March 2021.

Summary

Semi-finals 
The draw for the Semifinals was held on 23 March 2021 at 13:00 CET, after FFK presented its new brand. The first semifinal matches take place on April 7, while the return matches on April 21.

First leg

Second leg

Final

Statistics

Top scorers

Notes

References

Kosovar Cup seasons
Kosovo
Cup